Singapore International Arbitration Centre (SIAC) is a not-for-profit international arbitration organisation based in Singapore, which administers arbitrations under its own rules of arbitration and the UNCITRAL Arbitration Rules. It was established on 1 July 1991 and is located at Maxwell Chambers, formerly the Customs House.
SIAC arbitration awards have been enforced in many jurisdictions including Australia, China, Hong Kong SAR, India, Indonesia, Jordan, Thailand, UK, USA and Vietnam, amongst other New York Convention signatories. SIAC is a global arbitral institution providing case management services to parties from all over the world.

History
SIAC was established on 1 July 1991 as an independent, not-for-profit organisation in Singapore.

Rules

SIAC Arbitration Rules
The SIAC Rules (6th Edition, 1 August 2016) ("SIAC Rules 2016") are the primary rules of arbitration at the SIAC and have come into force on 1 August 2016. The SIAC Rules 2016 supersede the SIAC Rules (5th Edition, 1 April 2013), SIAC Rules (4th Edition, 1 July 2010) and SIAC Rules (3rd Edition, 1 July 2007).

Investment Arbitration Rules of the Singapore International Arbitration Centre
The 1st edition of the Investment Arbitration Rules of the Singapore International Arbitration Centre (1st Edition, 1 January 2017) (SIAC IA Rules 2017) is a specialised set of rules to address the unique issues present in the conduct of international investment arbitration. The SIAC IA Rules 2017 are effective as from 1 January 2017.

References

Arbitration organizations
Non-profit organisations based in Singapore